Audace was a destroyer of the Italian  (Royal Navy) built in the 1910s.

Design

They had a crew of 4 to 5 officers and 65 to 74 enlisted men. The ships were powered by two Zoelly steam turbines, with steam provided by four White-Forster water-tube boilers.

The ship carried an armament that consisted of a single  gun and four  guns, along with two  torpedo tubes. The 102 mm gun was placed on the forecastle and the two of the 76 mm guns were mounted abreast the funnels, with the remaining pair at the stern. The torpedo tubes were in single mounts, both on the centerline.

Service history
Audace was built at the  shipyard in Livorno, and was launched on 4 May 1913.

Audace was employed as a convoy escort during World War I, and on the night of 30 August 1916, she collided with the steamer  and sank off Capo Colonna.

Notes

References
 
 

Audace-class destroyers (1913)
1913 ships